Tara S. Peterson (born May 28, 1991) is an American curler from Shoreview, Minnesota. She currently plays lead for her sister Tabitha.

Career
As a junior curler, Peterson won three United States Junior Curling Championships, qualifying her to play in the 2009, 2010, and 2011 World Junior Curling Championships.  At the 2009 World Junior Curling Championships, Peterson played second for the Alexandra Carlson team and finished in 5th place. The following season, Peterson remained on the Carlson rink, and at the 2010 World Junior Curling Championships, the team won the bronze medal for the United States. The following year, Peterson joined the Wisconsin-based Rebecca Hamilton team at third. At the 2011 World Junior Curling Championships, the team finished in 5th. In 2012, they finished in third place at the U.S. Junior Championships.

After juniors, Peterson continued to play with Hamilton for one season (at second) until joining the Nina Roth rink in 2013 as her second. Peterson competed at the 2014 Ford World Women's Curling Championship as the alternate on team USA, skipped by Allison Pottinger (finished 6th). In 2014, she joined the Aileen Sormunen rink. With Sormunen, Peterson won her first World Curling Tour event at the 2014 St. Paul Cash Spiel.  She also played in her first Grand Slam event that season, going all the way to the semifinals of the 2014 Colonial Square Ladies Classic. The team acquired enough WCT Order of Merit Points to qualify as the U.S. National team for the 2015 World Women's Curling Championship.

At the 2020 United States Women's Championship, Peterson earned her second national title, as second for her sister Tabitha. In the round robin, Team Peterson's only loss came against Jamie Sinclair, but they then beat Team Sinclair in the 1 vs. 2 page playoff game and again in the final. As United States Champions Team Peterson would have represented the United States at the 2020 World Women's Curling Championship, but they lost that opportunity when the Championship was cancelled due to the COVID-19 pandemic. They also earned a spot at the final Grand Slam of the season, the Champions Cup, which was also cancelled due to the pandemic. Their qualification will instead carry over to the 2021 Champions Cup.

During the 2020 off-season, the team announced that Tabitha Peterson would remain as skip when Roth returned from maternity leave. Roth re-joined the team as vice-skip at third, with Hamilton moving to second, Tara Peterson to lead, and Geving to alternate. Due to the COVID-19 pandemic, the Peterson team did not compete in events for most of the 2020–21 season until entering a bio-secure bubble held in Calgary, Alberta in the spring of 2021 for three events in a row. The first two events were the Champions Cup and Players' Championship grand slams, with the team missing the playoffs at both. The third event in the Calgary bubble for Team Peterson was the 2021 World Women's Championship, in which they earned a spot as 2020 National Champions after the 2021 National Championship was moved to later in the spring due to the pandemic. They finished the 13-game round-robin in fifth place with a 7–6 record, earning them a spot in the playoffs and securing a 2022 Olympic berth for the United States. In the playoffs, Team Peterson defeated Denmark's Madeline Dupont but lost to Switzerland's Silvana Tirinzoni to end up in the bronze medal game. There, Peterson faced off against Sweden's Anna Hasselborg and won with a score of 9–5, including scoring five points in the seventh end. Team Peterson's bronze medal finish was the first World Women's medal for the United States in 15 years, and the first-ever bronze medal.

The Peterson rink won their first two events of the 2021–22 season, the US Open of Curling and the 2021 Curlers Corner Autumn Gold Curling Classic. The following week, they played in the 2021 Masters where they made it as far as the quarterfinals. The team then played in the 2021 United States Olympic Curling Trials, where they attempted to return to the Olympics. Through the round robin, the team posted a 9–1 record, putting them into the best-of-three final against Cory Christensen. The Peterson rink beat Christensen in two-straight games, booking their tickets to the 2022 Winter Olympics. After the Trials, the team played in one event before the Olympics, the Curl Mesabi Classic, which they won, beating Christensen again in the final. At the Olympics, the team finished the round robin with a 4–5 record, missing the playoffs. The team finished off the season by playing in two Slams, the 2022 Players' Championship and the 2022 Champions Cup, missing the playoffs in both events.

Personal life
Peterson's sister is fellow curler Tabitha Peterson. She is employed as a dentist and is married.

Teams

References

External links

Tara Peterson on the United States Curling Association database

1991 births
Living people
American female curlers
People from Burnsville, Minnesota
People from Eagan, Minnesota
People from Shoreview, Minnesota
Sportspeople from Minnesota
American dentists
American curling champions
21st-century American women
Curlers at the 2022 Winter Olympics
Olympic curlers of the United States